The Order of the White Rose of Finland is one of three official orders in Finland, along with the Order of the Cross of Liberty, and the Order of the Lion of Finland. The President of Finland is the Grand Master of all three orders. The orders are administered by boards consisting of a chancellor, a vice-chancellor and at least four members. The orders of the White Rose of Finland and the Lion of Finland have a joint board.

History 
The Order of the White Rose of Finland was established by Gustaf Mannerheim in his capacity as regent (temporary head of state) on January 28, 1919. The name comes from the nine roses argent in the coat of arms of Finland. The order's rules and regulations were confirmed on May 16, 1919, and its present rules date from June 1, 1940. The revised scale of ranks was confirmed most recently in 1985. The original decorations were designed by Akseli Gallen-Kallela. The swastikas of the collar were replaced by fir crosses in 1963, designed by heraldic artist Gustaf von Numers. The honour can be granted for military as well as civilian merit.

Insignia 
The ribbon for all classes is ultramarine, as it is found in the flag of Finland, although officially the statutes do not define the color of the ribbon beyond it being "dark blue".

The President of Finland wears the Grand Cross of the White Rose of Finland with Collar (a neck chain). The Collar is worn four centimetres from either side and hangs at equal distances at the front and back. The Grand Cross and Commander marks are awarded with a breast star.

Classes 

The classes of the order of the White Rose of Finland are:

 Grand Cross of the White Rose of Finland with Collar
 Grand Cross of the White Rose of Finland
 First Class Commander of the White Rose of Finland
 Commander of the White Rose of Finland
 First Class Knight of the White Rose of Finland
 Knight (Chevalier) of the White Rose of Finland
 Cross of Merit of the White Rose of Finland
 First Class Medal of the White Rose of Finland with golden cross
 First Class Medal of the White Rose of Finland
 Medal of the White Rose of Finland

Recipients 

Generally the Grand Cross with Collar is awarded only to foreign heads of state, e.g. to King Fuad I of Egypt (1935), Charles de Gaulle (1962), Josip Broz Tito (1963) and King Birendra of Nepal (1988). In the case of royals, consorts may be awarded with it. Heirs apparent of Nordic monarchies have also been awarded. The Grand Master may however in principle award it at his pleasure. During World War II Hermann Göring and Joachim von Ribbentrop were exceptionally given the Grand Cross with Collar because Adolf Hitler would not receive orders.

Prime Ministers of Finland customarily receive the Grand Cross. (Certain leftist politicians refused the cross or did not wear it, and the transient term in office of Anneli Jäätteenmäki did not lead to the President awarding the cross.) The Grand Cross is also given to presidents of the Supreme Court and the Supreme Administrative Court, the Archbishop of Turku and Finland, and the Chancellor of the order.

Recipients list 

2021  David Yoken, Cross of Merit of the White Rose of Finland, for promoting music and dance throughout the Nordic region, and climate action through artistic exchange.
2017  Helena Yli-Renko
2016  Pauline Kiltinen - Cross of Merit of the Order of the White Rose for the promotion of Finnish culture including the commissioning Rockland the Opera.
2015  Anna-Maja Henriksson, Commander of the White Rose of Finland
2015  Tapani Jyrki Tarvainen, Chevalier (Knight) of the White Rose of Finland
2011  Dr. Henry Tirri, First Class Knight of the White Rose of Finland  
 Former Executive Vice President and CTO of Nokia. Henry was a tenured Professor of Computer Science at the University of Helsinki.  Henry holds a Ph.D. in Computer Science from the University of Helsinki, Finland and an Honorary Doctorate from University of Tampere, Finland.
2011  Bob Foster
 Professor, Director – GAP, UCLA Anderson School of Management; as a First Class Knight, on December 09, 2011 "in recognition of his efforts, through the GAP program, to help Finnish technology companies expand into markets abroad, including the United States" and their advancement "further in corporate development."
2010  Rajendra Kumar Pachauri
2009  Bashar al-Assad
2009  Mart Laar
2009  Nursultan Nazarbayev, President of Kazakhstan
2008  Tim Purcell
 Knight 1st Class awarded 3 October 2008, presented in NSW Parliament House 6 Dec 2008 by the Finnish Ambassador Glenn Lindholm for fostering bilateral relationships between Australia and Finland Government, Business and Academia in the area of Innovation.
2008  Simon Beresford-Wylie, Chief Executive Officer, Nokia Siemens Networks, Awarded 2008
2008  Jim Gilleran
2008  Managing Director – Finnforest USA on 2008 September 12.
2007  James Cathey
2006  Erkki Oja, 2006
2005  Kostiantyn Tyshchenko, philologist, linguist
2004  Elwin Svenson
 Executive Director – International Programs, FEMBA/GAP programs, UCLA Anderson School of Management; as a First Class Knight, on December 11, 2004 "for assisting the expansion of Finnish start-up companies through the UCLA Anderson's Global Access Program." 
2003  Andrew Wilkinson, Knight, 1st Class, Order of the White Rose of Finland
1991  Margareta Steinby
1988  Ensio Seppänen, First Class Knight of the White Rose of Finland
1988  Birendra Bir Bikram Shah, Late king of Nepal
1984  Arthur J. Collingsworth, 1984
1983  Walter Werronen
1983 Leo Kyntäjä
1978  Dmitriy Ustinov, Marshal of the Soviet Union
1976  Leonid Brezhnev, 1976
1974  Carl XVI Gustaf, King of Sweden
1971  Arthur Lydiard, 1972
1971  Olli Mannermaa, 1979
1969  Anne, Princess Royal
1967  Zoltán Kodály, 1967 - First Class Commander of the White Rose of Finland (donated by President Kekkonen, 17 February, Finnish Embassy Budapest)
1967  Colonel Wayne J. Moe, US Army Attaché
1967  Greta Kukkonen
1963  Koča Popović
1963  Josip Broz Tito
1962  Charles de Gaulle
1961  Maggie Gripenberg 
1960  Jarl Lindfors, 1960
1958  John Fawcett
1955  Thomas Beecham, 1955
1951  Bernard Aabel, 1951, In 1948 Aabel became the Assistant Military Attaché in Helsinki, Finland
1947  Earl Wagner Twitchell
1944  Norman Cameron Moore, 1941
1942  Hirohito, Emperor of Japan
1942  Ion Antonescu
1941  Eduard Dietl
1941  Josef Veltjens
1941  Dean Driscoll, 1941, Chevalier (Knight) of the White Rose of Finland, for services "toward relieving the civilian population of wartorn Finland".
1939  Walther von Brauchitsch
1934  Shaul Tchernichovsky
1926  Ernesto Burzagli, 1926.
 -  Bhumibol Adulyadej, King of Thailand
 2012  Armi Kuusela, Miss Universe 1952
 -  Edward Rydz-Śmigły
 2004  Dáithí O'Ceallaigh
  Kalervo Kummola, Knight of the Order of White Rose of Finland, ice hockey executive, businessman, and politician

Special honors 
Grand Cross with Collar, Jewels and Swords was awarded only once, to Carl Gustaf Emil Mannerheim 4 June 1944.
Grand Cross with Jewels, to three Finns: Senator Otto Stenroth 1938, Foreign Minister Carl Enckell 1946 and Jean Sibelius 1950.
Grand Cross with Swords has been awarded to three Finnish Lieutenant Generals: Hjalmar Siilasvuo, Edvard Hanell and Aksel Airo. The decoration has also been awarded to a number of foreign high officers, such as the German Colonel General Eduard Dietl.

See also 
Orders, decorations, and medals of Finland

References

Works cited

Further reading

External links

Pictures of decorations
The Office of the President of the Republic of Finland: Order of the White Rose of Finland

Order of the White Rose of Finland
Awards established in 1919
Orders of merit
Finnish awards